Hazarşah is a village in the Solhan District, Bingöl Province, Turkey. The village is populated by Kurds of the Az tribe and had a population of 1,652 in 2021.

The hamlets of Aksakal and Erdemler are attached to the village.

References 

Villages in Solhan District
Kurdish settlements in Bingöl Province